Josef Müller-Brockmann (9 May 1914 – 30 August 1996) was a Swiss graphic designer, author, and educator, he was a Principal at Muller-Brockmann & Co. design firm. He was a pioneer of the International Typographic Style. Müller-Brockmann is recognized for his simple designs and his clean use of typography, shapes and colors which inspire many graphic designers in the 21st century.

Early life and education 
Josef Müller was born May 9, 1914 in Rapperswil, Switzerland. He studied architecture, design and art history at both the University of Zurich at Gewerbeschule, and Zurich University of the Arts (also known as Kunstgewerbeschule Zurich), where he studied with Ernst Keller and Alfred Willimann. 

He apprenticed in design and advertising with Walter Diggelman. In 1936, he opened his Zurich design studio specializing in graphic design, exhibition design, and photography. In 1937, he joined the Swiss Werkbund (Swiss Association of Artists and Designers). His favorite typeface to use was Akzidenz-Grotesk.

Career 
During the 1950s, Müller-Brockmann explored nonrepresentational abstraction, visual metaphor, subjective graphical representation, and constructive graphic design. He used shapes to and other geometric elements to express his work, without illustration or embellishments.

In 1950, he produced his first of many concert posters for the Tonhalle concert hall in Zurich, which became known as the Tonhalle Series or "Musica Viva". The Tonhalle Series grew increasingly abstract and focused on the feelings of the music. He used a visual form to translate the mathematical system that is found in music, playing with visual scale, rhythm, and repetition, while trying to stay true to each musicians composition who was featured on the poster.

In 1952, Müller-Brockmann designed an "accident barometer" which displayed statistics on reckless driving, which was displayed on a large scale sign in Paradeplatz for his client the Automobile Club of Switzerland.

In 1957, he began teaching at the Zurich University of the Arts, replacing Ernst Keller as a professor of graphic design. He was professor of graphic design at Zurich University of the Arts from 1957 to 1960, and guest lecturer at the University of Osaka from 1961, and the Ulm School of Design (German: Hochschule für Gestaltung Ulm) from 1963.

In 1958, Müller-Brockmann became a founding editor of New Graphic Design along with Hans Neuburg, Richard Paul Lohse, and Carlo Vivarelli. 

In 1967, he was appointed as a European design consultant to IBM and formed his design firm Muller-Brockmann & Co. 

Müller-Brockmann's work is included in many public museum collections including the Museum of Modern Art (MoMA), Cooper Hewitt, Smithsonian Design Museum, Museum of Design, Zürich (also known as Museum für Gestaltung Zürich), among others.

Personal life 
In 1943, he married violinist Verena Brockmann, and together they had one son Andreas (born 1944). At that point he changed his last name to Müller-Brockmann. The first marriage lasted until 1964, when Verena was killed in an accident.

In 1967, he married Japanese abstract painter Shizuko Yoshikawa.

Gallery

Bibliography
Müller-Brockmann was author of several books on design and visual communication.

References

Further reading 
Friedl, Friederich, Nicholas Ott and Bernard Stein. Typography: An encyclopedic survey of type design and techniques through history. Black Dog & Leventhal, 1998. .

1914 births
1996 deaths
Swiss graphic designers
People from Rapperswil-Jona
Swiss typographers and type designers